HAARP is a live album and video by English rock band Muse, released on 17 March 2008 in the United Kingdom and 1 April 2008 in the United States. The CD documents the band's performance at London's Wembley Stadium, as part of their Black Holes and Revelations Tour, on 16 June 2007, while the DVD contains 20 tracks from the performance on 17 June. The total number of audiences watching the band's shows on 16 and 17 June 2007 was 180,000 (150,000 seated and 30,000 standing). It was named the 40th greatest live album of all time by NME in 2010.

Set design
For their performances at Wembley, Muse had the stadium decked out with massive props to dress it as the Ionospheric Research Instrument of the High Frequency Active Auroral Research Program (HAARP), a US government-funded ionospheric research program in Gakona, Alaska which uses high frequency radio waves to cause changes in the ionosphere. and stated in a 2006 interview "Some people think it's designed to tap into the ionosphere to control the weather. Others think it's there to diffuse UFO beams, or to send out microwaves to control our thoughts". In 2008 they explained to Virgin Radio "All these sort of antennas, cables, screens and stuff are based on the same sort of layout as the HAARP layout".

Release and promotion

In the build-up to the release of the recordings, the band released a number of web-format clips from the DVD. The full performance of "Unintended" was added to the band's official website on Christmas Eve, 24 December 2007, dubbed as a "little taste of things to come". On 11 January 2008, a microsite at www.he-3.mu was announced, featuring a grid of six boxes representing thumbnails of short clips from the DVD. As of 17 March, all six clips have been filled, featuring short clips from "Knights of Cydonia", "Supermassive Black Hole", "Feeling Good", "New Born", "Blackout" and the outro riffs of "Stockholm Syndrome". "Feeling Good" was also released in full to radio and television stations shortly afterwards, although it was not advertised on the official website. Vue cinemas held special screenings of the concert in high definition on 11 March 2008 at select cinemas.

A special edition of HAARP was released in addition to the regular CD/DVD, which features additional backstage footage and bonus postcards showing pictures of the three band members. The HAARP microsite is available for visitors to download iPod- and iPod Touch-/iPhone-formatted videos and mp3s of "Knights of Cydonia", "Supermassive Black Hole", "Unintended" and "Plug in Baby" featured on the DVD for free. Included is a bonus video of "Micro Cuts" and an mp3 of "Soldier's Poem" from the performance on 16 June.

Track listing
All songs written and composed by Matthew Bellamy, except where otherwise noted.

Notes

1. "Knights of Cydonia" incorporates elements of "Close Encounters of the Third Kind", written by John Williams
2. "Map of the Problematique" incorporates elements of "Maggie's Farm" as performed by Rage Against the Machine, originally written and performed by Bob Dylan
3. "New Born" incorporates elements of "Microphone Fiend" as performed by Rage Against the Machine, originally written and performed by Eric B. & Rakim and containing elements of "School Boy Crush", written by Hamish Stuart, Steve Ferrone, Alan Gorrie, Roger Ball, Molly Duncan and Onnie McIntyre and originally performed by the Average White Band
4.  "Stockholm Syndrome" incorporates elements of "Township Rebellion" originally written and performed by Rage Against the Machine and "Endless, Nameless" written and performed by Nirvana, as well as a rudimentary version of the main riff of their future song "Psycho"

5.  An easter egg features on the DVD. If the 'Gallery' screen is displayed, the left button on the remote control can be clicked to highlight Dominic Howard's trousers. If the enter button is pressed whilst the trousers are highlighted, a screen will come up advertising the band's website.

Charts and certifications

Weekly charts

Year-end charts

Certifications

Credits

Muse
Matthew Bellamy – lead vocals, lead guitar, piano, production, mixing
Christopher Wolstenholme – bass, backing vocals, lead guitar on "Hoodoo", production, mixing
Dominic Howard – drums, backing vocals on "Supermassive Black Hole", synthesizer on "Take a Bow", production, mixing

Additional musicians
Morgan Nicholls – keyboards, synthesizers, backing vocals, cabasa on "Supermassive Black Hole", bass on "Hoodoo", glockenspiel on "Soldier's Poem"
Dan Newell – trumpet on "Knights of Cydonia" and "City of Delusion"

Additional personnel
Rich Costey – mixing
Thomas Kirk – directing, editing, screen visuals
Tommaso Colliva – assistant mixing
Justin Gerrish – assistant mixing
Vlado Meller – mastering
Mark Santangelo – assistant mastering
Ben Curzon – artwork
Hans-Peter Van Velthoven – photography

References

External links
Official Muse website
 HAARP website]

Muse (band) live albums
Live albums recorded at Wembley Stadium
2008 live albums
2008 video albums
Muse (band) video albums
Live video albums